Six-T-Six is the first EP by American heavy metal band Souls at Zero.

Track listing
All songs written and composed by Souls at Zero, unless otherwise noted.

Personnel 
 Brad Divens – lead vocals, bass
 Jay Abbene – guitars
 Terry Carter – guitars
 Shannon Larkin – drums

Production
Drew Mazurek – engineer

Reception
AllMusic

References

1994 EPs
Thrash metal EPs